Wangchannoi Sor Palangchai or Wangchannoi Sor Sirada (born: May 30, 1967 in Lopburi) is a retired Muay Thai fighter from Thailand. He was a famous and popular fighter in the 80s and 90s.  His complete record has not been saved, but it's expected to be around 300 fights with no more than 50 losses. He is well known for his heavy punching power. He fought under other names such as "Wangchannoi Wor Valapon" (วังจั่นน้อย ว.วราพล) and "Wangchannoi Chor Tabtimto" (วังจั่นน้อย ช.ทับทิมโต).

Biography and career
Wangchannoi (nickname: Porn; ภรณ์) was born in Tambon Wang Chan, Amphoe Khok Samrong, Lopburi province  in central Thailand. He received a diploma from Rattana Commercial School (currently Rattana Bundit University). He started his career at the age of 10 by establishing a reputation in his native. Later, he came to Bangkok as a fighter under the famous promoter Songchai Rattanasuban. He is more known when he can overcome Namphon Nongkeepahuyuth won Lumpinee Stadium Junior flyweight title as a part of professional boxing WBC world Super flyweight title match between Gilberto Román vs Kongtoranee Payakaroon undercard, and also has won four times Lumpinee Stadium Flyweight title.

Later, he stripped for promoted to the heavier division. He won five times Lumpinee Stadium Junior featherweight titles, his highest salary is 260,000 baht. He fought with many famous fighters, such as Oley Kiatoneway, Chamuakpetch Hapalang, Samransak Muangsurin, Kongtoranee Payakaroon, Jaroenthong Kiatbanchong, Karuhat Sor.Supawan, and a legendary Samart Payakaroon. Especially with the Samart, which is considered the best Muay Thai fighter of the era. He can overcome on the undercard of professional boxing IBF Junior flyweight world title match between Tacy Macalos vs. Muangchai Kittikasem on May 2, 1989 at Lumpinee Stadium. After the bout, Samart announced his retirement on ring immediately. In 1993, he was awarded best fighter of the year.

He received the nickname from Muay Thai fans "33 sec. puncher" from his defeat knockout Namkabuan Nongkeepahuyuth, a younger brother of Namphon Nongkeepahuyuth in the first round with only 33 seconds with a fist. In addition, he also has another nickname "Chivas lad" since he often booze with his friends after the bout.

Retirement
He last fight with a defeat to Rambonoi Chor Tabtim by points in 1997. After retirement, he has been a Muay thai trainer in his older brother's Muay Thai gym for a while. After that, he traveled to France to be a trainer and switch to fight for two years to return to Thailand.

At present, Wangchannoi is a trainer at "Chor Hapayak Gym" at Tambon Lam Luk Ka, Amphoe Lam Luk Ka, Pathum Thani province.

Titles
Lumpinee Stadium
 1986 Lumpinee Stadium 108 lbs Champion
 1988 Lumpinee Stadium 122 lbs Champion (defended once)
 1991 Lumpinee Stadium 122 lbs Champion
 1993 Lumpinee Stadium 122 lbs Champion
 1994 Lumpinee Stadium 122 lbs Champion

International Muay Thai Council
 2001 IMTC World Champion

Awards
1993 Sports Writers Association of Thailand Fighter of the Year

Fight record

|-  bgcolor="#fbb"
| 2001-|| Loss ||align=left| Nourdine El Otmani||  || Amsterdam, Netherlands || ||  ||
|- style="background:#cfc;"
| 2000-11-05 || Win ||align=left| Damien Trainor || ||  England  || TKO (Jumping knee)|| 3 ||
|-  bgcolor="#cfc"
| 2000-06-12|| Win ||align=left| Joao Monteiro ||   || Fort-de-France, Martinique || ||  ||
|-  bgcolor="#cfc"
| 2000-05-|| Win ||align=left| Djamel Yacouben ||   || Clermont-Ferrand, France || Decision  || 5 || 3:00
|-  bgcolor="#cfc"
| 2000-05-20|| Win ||align=left| Christophe Leveque ||  Gala France Thaïlande || Villebon-sur-Yvette, France || KO  || 4 ||
|- style="background:#cfc;"
| 2000-04-22 || Win ||align=left| Stevie Sheddeon || ||  Scotland  ||KO || 3 ||
|-
! style=background:white colspan=9 |
|- style="background:#cfc;"
| 2000-02-12 || Win ||align=left| Julien Muller || ||  Nantes, France  || Decision || 5 || 3:00
|-  bgcolor="#cfc"
| 1999-12-05|| Win ||align=left| Joao Monteiro ||   || Saint-Nazaire, France || ||  ||
|- style="background:#cfc;"
| || Win ||align=left| Jean-Marc Savonnier || ||  France  || ||  ||
|- style="background:#fbb;"
| 1997 || Loss||align=left| Rambojiew Por.Tubtim ||Rajadamnern Stadium ||  Bangkok, Thailand  || Decision || 5 || 3:00
|- style="background:#fbb;"
| 1996-10-05 || Loss ||align=left| Dokmafai Tor.Sithichai || Lumpinee Stadium ||  Bangkok, Thailand  || Decision|| 5 || 3:00
|- style="background:#cfc;"
| 1995-11-13 || Win ||align=left| Thaphisun Sor.Maliwan || Lumpinee Stadium ||  Bangkok, Thailand  || Decision|| 5 || 3:00
|- style="background:#cfc;"
| 1995-08-19 || Win ||align=left| Prayut Na Phinthorn || Lumpinee Stadium ||  Bangkok, Thailand  || Decision|| 5 || 3:00
|- style="background:#fbb;"
| 1995-06-27 || Loss ||align=left| Kaoponglek Luksuratum || Lumpinee Stadium ||  Bangkok, Thailand  || Decision|| 5 || 3:00
|- style="background:#cfc;"
| 1995-06-09 || Win ||align=left| Teerapong Sitkorayuth || Lumpinee Stadium ||  Bangkok, Thailand  || Decision|| 5 || 3:00

|- style="background:#fbb;"
| 1995-04-18 || Loss||align=left| Jompoplek Sor.Sumalee || Lumpinee Stadium ||  Bangkok, Thailand  || Decision|| 5 || 3:00

|- style="background:#cfc;"
| 1995-02-28 || Win||align=left| Keng Singnakhonkui || Lumpinee Stadium ||  Bangkok, Thailand  || Decision|| 5 || 3:00

|- style="background:#cfc;"
| 1994-12-04 || Win ||align=left| Lamnamoon Sor.Sumalee || Lumpinee Stadium ||  Bangkok, Thailand  || KO (Left Hook)||  ||
|-  style="background:#fbb;"
| 1994-10-10 ||Loss ||align=left| Saengmorakot Sor.Ploenjit || Rajadamnern Stadium || Bangkok, Thailand || TKO (Punches)|| 3 ||
|-  style="background:#fbb;"
| 1994-08-26 ||Loss ||align=left| Samkor Kiatmontep || Lumpinee Stadium || Bangkok, Thailand || Decision || 5 || 3:00
|- style="background:#fbb;"
| 1994-07-29 || Loss ||align=left| Hansuk Prasathinpanomrung || Lumpinee Stadium ||  Bangkok, Thailand  || Decision || 5 || 3:00
|-
! style=background:white colspan=9 |
|-  style="background:#cfc;"
| 1994-05-27 || Win ||align=left| Boonlai Sor.Thanikul  || Lumpinee Stadium ||  Bangkok, Thailand  || Decision || 5 || 3:00
|- style="background:#cfc;"
| 1994-04-29 || Win ||align=left| Karuhat Sor.Supawan || Lumpinee Stadium ||  Bangkok, Thailand  || Decision || 5 || 3:00
|-
! style=background:white colspan=9 |
|-  style="background:#cfc;"
| 1994-03-08 || Win ||align=left| Kaensak Sor.Ploenjit  || Lumpinee Stadium ||  Bangkok, Thailand  || Decision || 5 || 3:00
|- style="background:#cfc;"
| 1994-02-15 || Win||align=left| Kaensak Sor.Ploenjit  || Lumpinee Stadium ||  Bangkok, Thailand  || Decision || 5 || 3:00
|- style="background:#cfc;"
| 1994-01-07 || Win ||align=left| Karuhat Sor.Supawan || Lumpinee Stadium ||  Bangkok, Thailand  || Decision || 5 || 3:00
|- style="background:#fbb;"
| 1993-11-30 || Loss||align=left| Chatchai Paiseetong || Lumpinee Stadium ||  Bangkok, Thailand  || Decision || 5 || 3:00
|-
! style=background:white colspan=9 |
|- style="background:#cfc;"
| 1993-10-22 || Win||align=left| Chatchai Paiseetong || Lumpinee Stadium ||  Bangkok, Thailand  || Decision || 5 || 3:00
|-
! style=background:white colspan=9 |
|-  style="background:#cfc;"
| 1993-09-17 || Win ||align=left| Mathee Jadeepitak  || Lumpinee Stadium ||  Bangkok, Thailand  || Decision || 5 || 3:00
|-  style="background:#cfc;"
| 1993-08-31 || Win ||align=left| Jaroensap Kiatbanchong  || Lumpinee Stadium ||  Bangkok, Thailand  || Decision || 5 || 3:00
|-  style="background:#cfc;"
| 1993-07-30 || Win ||align=left| Hansuk Prasathinpanomrung  || Lumpinee Stadium ||  Bangkok, Thailand  || Decision || 5 || 3:00

|-  style="background:#cfc;"
| 1993-07-11 || Win ||align=left| Jompoplek Sor.Sumalee  ||  ||  Nakhon Sawan, Thailand  || Decision || 5 || 3:00

|-  style="background:#fbb;"
| 1993-03-16|| Loss ||align=left| Rittichai Lookchaomaesaithong || Lumpinee Stadium || Bangkok, Thailand || Decision || 5 || 3:00
|-  style="background:#fbb;"
| 1993-02-05|| Loss ||align=left| Oley Kiatoneway || Lumpinee Stadium || Bangkok, Thailand || Decision || 5 || 3:00
|- style="background:#cfc;"
| 1992-12-04 || Win||align=left| Lamnamoon Sor.Sumalee || Lumpinee Stadium ||  Bangkok, Thailand  || KO || 2 ||
|-  style="background:#fbb;"
| 1992-11-06 ||Loss ||align=left| Pompetch Naratreekul || Lumpinee Stadium || Bangkok, Thailand || Decision || 5 || 3:00
|- style="background:#cfc;"
| 1992-07-11 || Win||align=left| Jompoplek Sor.Sumalee  || Lumpinee Stadium ||  Bangkok, Thailand  || Decision || 5 || 3:00
|-  style="background:#fbb;"
| 1992-06-30 ||Loss ||align=left| Nungubon Sitlerchai || Lumpinee Stadium || Bangkok, Thailand || KO || 2 ||
|-  style="background:#fbb;"
| 1992-05-29 ||Loss ||align=left| Nuathoranee Thongracha || Lumpinee Stadium || Bangkok, Thailand || Decision || 5 || 3:00
|- style="background:#cfc;"
| 1992-04-07 || Win||align=left| Cherry Sor Wanich  || Lumpinee Stadium ||  Bangkok, Thailand  || KO (Right uppercut)|| 2 ||
|- style="background:#cfc;"
| 1992-03-10 || Win||align=left| Karuhat Sor.Supawan  || Lumpinee Stadium ||  Bangkok, Thailand  || Decision || 5 || 3:00
|- style="background:#fbb;"
| 1992-01-31 || Loss ||align=left| Boonlai Sor.Thanikul || Lumpinee Stadium ||  Bangkok, Thailand  || Decision || 5 || 3:00
|-
! style=background:white colspan=9 |
|-  style="background:#fbb;"
| 1991-12-27 || Loss||align=left| Namkabuan Nongkee Pahuyuth  || Lumpinee Stadium ||  Bangkok, Thailand  || Decision || 5 || 3:00
|-  style="background:#cfc;"
| 1991-11-26 || Win||align=left| Namkabuan Nongkee Pahuyuth  || Lumpinee Stadium ||  Bangkok, Thailand  || Decision || 5 || 3:00
|- style="background:#cfc;"
| 1991-10-25 || Win||align=left| Jongsanan Fairtex  || Lumpinee Stadium ||  Bangkok, Thailand  || Decision || 5 || 3:00
|- style="background:#cfc;"
| 1991-09-03 || Win||align=left| Cherry Sor Wanich  || Lumpinee Stadium ||  Bangkok, Thailand  || Decision || 5 || 3:00
|-  style="background:#cfc;"
| 1991-08-06 || Win||align=left| Petchdam Sor.Bodin  || Lumpinee Stadium ||  Bangkok, Thailand  || KO (Punches) || 1 || 
|-
! style=background:white colspan=9 |

|-  style="background:#cfc;"
| 1991-07-02|| Win ||align=left| Jaroenthong Kiatbanchong || Lumpinee Stadium || Bangkok, Thailand || Decision || 5 || 3:00
|-  style="background:#cfc;"
| 1991-06-14 || Win||align=left| Superlek Sorn E-Sarn  || Lumpinee Stadium ||  Bangkok, Thailand  || Decision || 5 || 3:00
|-
! style=background:white colspan=9 |
|-  style="background:#fbb;"
| 1991-04-30 || Loss||align=left| Namkabuan Nongkee Pahuyuth  || Lumpinee Stadium ||  Bangkok, Thailand  || Decision || 5 || 3:00
|-  style="background:#cfc;"
| 1991-04-05 || Win||align=left| Samranthong Kiatbanchong || Lumpinee Stadium ||  Bangkok, Thailand  || TKO || 1 || 1:30
|-  style="background:#fbb;"
| 1991-03-05|| Loss ||align=left| Oley Kiatoneway || Lumpinee Stadium || Bangkok, Thailand || Decision || 5 || 3:00
|-  style="background:#cfc;"
| 1991-01-21 || Win ||align=left| Oley Kiatoneway || Rajadamnern Stadium || Bangkok, Thailand || Decision || 5 || 3:00
|-
! style=background:white colspan=9 |
|-  style="background:#cfc;"
| 1990-12-18 || Win||align=left| Superlek Chor.Sawat || Lumpinee Stadium || Bangkok, Thailand || Decision  || 5 || 3:00
|-  style="background:#cfc;"
| 1990-11-20|| Win||align=left| Dokmaipa Por Pongsawang || Lumpinee Stadium || Bangkok, Thailand || Decision || 5 || 3:00
|-  style="background:#cfc;"
| 1990-10-30 || Win ||align=left| Namkabuan Nongkee Pahuyuth  || Lumpinee Stadium ||  Bangkok, Thailand  || KO (Left Hook) || 1 || 0:33
|-  style="background:#fbb;"
| 1990-08-07 || Loss||align=left| Superlek Chor.Sawat || Lumpinee Stadium || Bangkok, Thailand || Decision  || 5 || 3:00
|-  style="background:#cfc;"
| 1990-07-10 || Win ||align=left| Rainbow Sor.Prantalay  || Lumpinee Stadium ||  Bangkok, Thailand  || KO (Left hook) ||1 ||

|-  style="background:#fbb;"
| 1990-06-08 || Loss ||align=left| Kangwannoi Sor Sribulaoy|| Lumpinee Stadium || Bangkok, Thailand || Decision || 5 ||

|-  style="background:#cfc;"
| 1990-05-15 || Win ||align=left| Langsuan Panyuthaphum || Lumpinee Stadium || Bangkok, Thailand || Decision || 5 ||

|-  style="background:#cfc;"
| 1990-03-30 ||Win ||align=left| Detduang Por.Pongsawang || Lumpinee Stadium || Bangkok, Thailand || Decision  || 5 || 3:00

|-  style="background:#cfc;"
| 1990-03-02 ||Win ||align=left| Yodphet Sor.Jitpattana || Lumpinee Stadium || Bangkok, Thailand || Decision  || 5 || 3:00
|-  style="background:#cfc;"
| 1990-01-19 || Win ||align=left| Boonlong Sor.Thanikul || Lumpinee Stadium || Bangkok, Thailand || Decision || 5 || 3:00

|-  style="background:#c5d2ea;"
| 1989-10-06 || NC ||align=left| Superlek Chor.Sawat || Lumpinee Stadium || Bangkok, Thailand || Referee Stoppage || 5 ||
|-
! style=background:white colspan=9 |

|-  style="background:#cfc;"
| 1989-08-29 || Win ||align=left| Noppadet Sor.Rewadee || Lumpinee Stadium || Bangkok, Thailand || KO ||2  ||
|-  style="background:#cfc;"
| 1989-07-25 ||Win ||align=left| Kaonar Sor Kettalingchan || Lumpinee Stadium || Bangkok, Thailand || Decision  || 5 || 3:00
|-
! style=background:white colspan=9 |
|-  style="background:#fbb;"
| 1989-06-30 || Loss ||align=left| Noppadet Sor.Rewadee || Lumpinee Stadium || Bangkok, Thailand || Decision || 5 ||
|-  style="background:#cfc;"
| 1989-05-10 ||Win ||align=left| Samart Payakaroon || Lumpinee Stadium || Bangkok, Thailand || Decision  || 5 || 3:00
|-  style="background:#cfc;"
| 1989-01-31 ||Win ||align=left| Kongtoranee Payakaroon || Lumpinee Stadium || Bangkok, Thailand || Decision || 5 || 3:00
|-  style="background:#cfc;"
| 1989-01-06 ||Win ||align=left| Samransak Muangsurin || Lumpinee Stadium || Bangkok, Thailand || Decision  || 5 || 3:00
|- style="background:#cfc;"
| 1988-11-25 || Win ||align=left| Panomtuanlek Hapalang || Lumpinee Stadium ||  Bangkok, Thailand  || TKO (Doctor Stoppage) || 2 || 
|-
! style=background:white colspan=9 |
|-  style="background:#cfc;"
| 1988-10-11|| Win||align=left| Chamuakpetch Haphalung || Lumpinee Stadium || Bangkok, Thailand || Decision || 5 || 3:00
|-  style="background:#cfc;"
| 1988-09-09 || Win ||align=left| Langsuan Panyuthaphum || Lumpinee Stadium || Bangkok, Thailand || KO || 2 ||

|-  style="background:#cfc;"
| 1988-07-08|| Win||align=left| Sanguannoi Sor Rungroj || Lumpinee Stadium || Bangkok, Thailand || KO|| 2 ||

|-  style="background:#cfc;"
| 1988-05-27|| Win||align=left| Khunpol Chor.Rojanchai || Lumpinee Stadium || Bangkok, Thailand || Decision || 5 || 3:00
|-  style="background:#cfc;"
| 1988-05-02|| Win||align=left| Khunpol Chor.Rojanchai || Lumpinee Stadium || Bangkok, Thailand || Decision || 5 || 3:00
|-  style="background:#fbb;"
| 1988-03-25|| Loss||align=left| Paruhatlek Sitchunthong || Lumpinee Stadium || Bangkok, Thailand || Decision || 5 || 3:00
|-  style="background:#cfc;"
| 1988-03-04|| Win||align=left| Audnoi Lukprabat|| Lumpinee Stadium || Bangkok, Thailand || Decision || 5 || 3:00
|-  style="background:#fbb;"
| 1988-01-26|| Loss||align=left| Dokmaipa Por Pongsawang || Lumpinee Stadium || Bangkok, Thailand || Decision || 5 || 3:00
|-
! style=background:white colspan=9 |

|-  style="text-align:center; background:#cfc;"
| 1987-11-27|| Win||align=left| Dokmaipa Por Pongsawang || Lumpinee Stadium || Bangkok, Thailand || KO (Punches)||  || 

|-  style="background:#fbb;"
| 1987-10-27|| Loss||align=left| Langsuan Panyuthaphum || Lumpinee Stadium || Bangkok, Thailand || Decision || 5 || 3:00
|-
! style=background:white colspan=9 |
|-  style="background:#cfc;"
| 1987-07-24 || Win||align=left| Jaroenthong Kiatbanchong ||  || Bangkok, Thailand || KO || 2 || 
|- style="background:#fbb;"
| 1987-04-28 || Loss ||align=left| Morakot Sor.Tamarangsri || Lumpinee Stadium ||  Bangkok, Thailand  || Decision || 5 || 3:00
|- style="background:#fbb;"
| 1987-01-13 || Loss ||align=left| Dennuah Denmolee || Lumpinee Stadium ||  Bangkok, Thailand  || Referee Stoppage|| 5 ||

|-  style="background:#cfc;"
| 1986-12-19 || Win ||align=left| Namphon Nongkee Pahuyuth ||Indoor Stadium Huamark || Bangkok, Thailand || Decision || 5 || 3:00 
|-
! style=background:white colspan=9 |
|- style="background:#cfc;"
| 1986-11-18 || Win ||align=left| Kaopho Sit.Chanyuth || Lumpinee Stadium ||  Bangkok, Thailand  || KO || 1 ||
|- style="background:#cfc;"
| 1986-10-14 || Win ||align=left| Dennuah Denmolee || Lumpinee Stadium ||  Bangkok, Thailand  || KO || 4 ||
|- style="background:#fbb;"
| 1986-09-12 || Loss ||align=left| Paruhatlek Sitchunthong || Lumpinee Stadium ||  Bangkok, Thailand  || Decision || 5 || 3:00

|-  style="background:#cfc;"
| 1986-08-22 || Win ||align=left| Namphon Nongkeepahuyuth || Lumpinee Stadium || Bangkok, Thailand || Decision || 5 || 3:00

|-  style="background:#cfc;"
| 1986- || Win ||align=left| Yodmanud Sityodtong || Lumpinee Stadium || Bangkok, Thailand || Decision || 5 || 3:00
|-  style="background:#fbb;"
| 1986- || Loss ||align=left| Kongsak Sitsamtahan || Lumpinee Stadium || Bangkok, Thailand || Decision || 5 || 3:00
|-  style="background:#cfc;"
| 1986- || Win ||align=left| Kopho Sit.Chanyuth || Rajadamnern Stadium || Bangkok, Thailand || Decision || 5 || 3:00
|-  style="background:#cfc;"
| 1985- || Win ||align=left| Muangchonnoi Lukprabart || Lumpinee Stadium || Bangkok, Thailand || Decision || 5 || 3:00
|-  style="background:#c5d2ea;"
| 1985- || Draw||align=left| Muangchonnoi Lukprabart || Lumpinee Stadium || Bangkok, Thailand || Decision || 5 || 3:00
|-  style="background:#fbb;"
| 1985- || Loss ||align=left| Kohpoh Sitchanyuth || Lumpinee Stadium || Bangkok, Thailand || Decision || 5 || 3:00
|-  style="background:#fbb;"
| 1985- || Loss ||align=left| Yodmanud Sityodtong || Lumpinee Stadium || Bangkok, Thailand || Decision || 5 || 3:00
|- style="background:#cfc;"
| 1985- || Win ||align=left| Khanunlek Hapalang || Lumpinee Stadium ||  Bangkok, Thailand  || Decision || 5 || 3:00
|- style="background:#fbb;"
| 1985-06-22 || Loss ||align=left| Dennuah Denmolee || Lumpinee Stadium ||  Bangkok, Thailand  || Decision || 5 || 3:00 
|-
! style=background:white colspan=9 |
|-  style="background:#cfc;"
| 1985-05-10 || Win ||align=left| Langsuan Panyuthaphum|| Lumpinee Stadium || Bangkok, Thailand || Decision || 5 || 3:00
|-  style="background:#cfc;"
| 1985- || Win ||align=left| Eddy Sitwatsiripong || Lumpinee Stadium || Bangkok, Thailand || KO || 3 ||
|-  style="background:#cfc;"
| 1985- || Win ||align=left| Tik Lukprabat || Lumpinee Stadium || Bangkok, Thailand || KO || 3 ||
|-  style="background:#cfc;"
| 1985- || Win ||align=left| Khaosanit Sor.Ploenchit || Lumpinee Stadium || Bangkok, Thailand || Decision || 5 || 3:00
|-  style="background:#cfc;"
| 1985- || Win ||align=left| Maewpa Suanmisakawan || Lumpinee Stadium || Bangkok, Thailand || Decision || 5 || 3:00
|- style="background:#c5d2ea;"
| 1984-11-09 || Draw||align=left| Rungtiwa Sor.Ploenchit || Lumpinee Stadium ||  Bangkok, Thailand  || Decision || 5 || 3:00

|-
| colspan=9 | Legend:

References

1967 births
Living people
Wangchannoi Sor Palangchai
Wangchannoi Sor Palangchai
Flyweight kickboxers
Bantamweight kickboxers
Muay Thai trainers